Archelaus may refer to:

Historical persons 
Archelaus (poet), author of a long poem in iambics called "Περὶ τῆς ῾Ιερᾶς Τέχνης"
Archelaus (geographer), author of a work on the countries visited by Alexander the Great
Archelaus, rhetorician mentioned by Diogenes Laërtius (2.17)
Archelaus of Sparta (r. 790–760 BC), Agiad king of Sparta
Archelaus (philosopher) (fl. 5th century BC), pupil of Anaxagoras
Archelaus I of Macedon (r. 413–399 BC), king of Macedon
Archelaus (son of Amyntas III) (d. 359 BC), half-brother of Philip II of Macedonia
Archelaus (son of Androcles) (fl. 321 BC), phrourarch of Aornus
Archelaus (phrourarch) (fl. 326 BC), phrourarch of Tyre
Archelaus of Priene (fl. c. 300 BC), an ancient Greek sculptor
Archelaus Chersonesita (fl. 3rd century BC), Egyptian epigrammatist
Archelaus (Pontic army officer) (died 63 BC), general of Mithridates VI of Pontus
Archelaus (high priest of Comana Cappadocia) (died 55 BC), priest of Bellona in Comana, Cappadocia
Archelaus (father of Archelaus of Cappadocia) (fl. 55–47 BC), priest of Bellona in Comana, Cappadocia
Archelaus of Cappadocia (r. 36 BC – 17 AD), king of Cappadocia
Herod Archelaus (23 BC – c. 18 AD), ethnarch of Samaria, Judea, and Idumea, 4 BC – 6 AD
Archelaus of Cilicia (died 38 AD), king of Cicilia Trachaea and Eastern Lycaonia from 17 AD
Archelaus the deacon (died 235 AD), third-century saint martyred with Quiriacus of Ostia
Archelaus (bishop of Carrhae) (fl. 278 AD), bishop who held a public dispute with Manichaean heretics
Archelaus (bishop of Caesarea) (fl. 5th century AD), bishop who wrote against the Messalian heresy
Archelaus Tupper (died 1781) sergeant in the Vermont militia, the circumstances of whose death resulted in the secret armistice between the Vermont Republic the British becoming publicly known

Mythical persons
 Archelaus (son of Temenus)
Archelaus, son of Heracles
Archelaus, son of Electryon and Anaxo, killed by the sons of Pterelaus
Archelaus, son of Aegyptus. He was killed by his wife, Anaxibia, daughter of Danaus

Other
Archelaus (play) by Euripides

See also
Arcesilaus (disambiguation), a name commonly transliterated as "Archelaus"